Kot Chandi is a village of Lahore District in the Punjab province of Pakistan. It is located at 31°32'48N 73°47'58E with an altitude of 194 metres.

References

Villages in Lahore District